The filmography of Ramesh Aravind includes over 140 films which Ramesh Aravind has acted in, which includes Kannada, Tamil, Telugu, Hindi, Malayalam and Tulu films. Pushpaka Vimana is his 100th Kannada film. 

1996-97 was a golden period in Ramesh Aravind's filmography.

His movies Anuraga Sangama, Karpoorada Gombe, Namoora Mandara Hoove, Amrutavarshini, America America, Ulta Palta, O Mallige, Mungarina Minchu, Tutta Mutta has successfully completed a 100-day run consecutively that year.

His journey in filmland continues to this day in all aspects of filmmaking - as director of comedy film Rama Shama Bhama and as an actor in cult movies like Aptamitra, Pushpaka Vimana, Shivaji Surathkal and 100. He is presently acting in ShivajiSuratkal 2.

Filmography

As actor

1980s

1990s

2000s

2010s

2020s

Television

As director

References

External links
 

Indian filmographies
Male actor filmographies
Director filmographies